Asecs, earlier A6 center is a shopping mall in Jönköping, Sweden. The shopping mall was opened on 2 April 1987, following the 1985 disestablishment of the Småland Artillery Regiment, which formerly used the building where Asecs is located now.

The shopping mall is located on both the northern and the southern side of the E4 motorway and is connected with a covered bridge spanning across the motorway. Major parts of the shopping mall are located at this bridge. Until 2019, the bridge also housed a McDonald's restaurant from where the motorway could be seen.

On 26 October 2017, the mall changed name to Asecs, spelling-wise.

Asecs can also be reached by train. The closest station is at Rocksjön.

References

External links
official website 

1987 establishments in Sweden
Buildings and structures in Jönköping
Bridges completed in 1987
Shopping centres in Sweden
Covered bridges in Sweden
Shopping malls established in 1987